Jawed Usmani is a retired IAS officer. He also served as the Chief Information Commissioner of Uttar Pradesh. He was the Chief Secretary to the Government of Uttar Pradesh from March 2012 to May 2014.

Education 
Usmani has an MBA from the Indian Institute of Management Ahmedabad and an MSc in Social Policy and Planning from the London School of Economics.

Career
Usmani was an officer of the 1978 batch of the Indian Administrative Service (IAS) belonging to the Uttar Pradesh cadre. Prior to appointment as Chief Secretary of Uttar Pradesh, he worked in different capacities in the government of India, including as Joint Secretary to the Prime Minister. In the international arena, Usmani was Senior Advisor to the Executive Director at the World Bank in Washington, D.C. and Minister (Economic Cooperation) at the Embassy of India in Nepal.

Usmani's key assignments in the state government included Principal Secretary to the Chief Minister, Special Secretary to the Chief Minister, Managing Director and CEO of UP State Cement Corporation, and District Magistrate and Collector of Gorakhpur and Bulandshahr districts. After his removal from the post of Chief Secretary of Uttar Pradesh Government, Usmani served as the Chairman of Uttar Pradesh Board of Revenue.

Usmani took voluntary retirement (VRS) from the Indian Administrative Service in February 2015, and was subsequently appointed the Chief Information Commissioner of Uttar Pradesh.

Bibliography

References

External links
Uttar Pradesh Information Commission

India Today High and Mighty power list 2012: The Official Top 10



Indian Institute of Management Ahmedabad alumni
Indian Muslims
Alumni of the London School of Economics
1956 births
Living people
Aligarh Muslim University alumni
Indian Administrative Service officers
Chief Secretaries of Uttar Pradesh